Qaleh Now-e Olya (also Romanized as Qal‘eh Now-e ‘Olyā, Qal’eh Now-Ye-’Olyā, Qal‘eh-ye Now ‘Ōlyā, and Qal‘eh-ye Now-ye ‘Olyā; also known as Qal‘eh-i-Nau, Qal‘eh Now, Qal‘eh Now-e Bālā, Qal‘eh-ye Now, and Qal‘eh-ye Now Bālā) is a village in Bala Velayat Rural District, Bala Velayat District, Bakharz County, Razavi Khorasan Province, Iran. At the 2006 census, its population was 1,892, in 450 families.

References 

Populated places in Bakharz County